Talas may refer to:

Places
Talas Region, Kyrgyzstan
Talas, Kyrgyzstan
Talas Alatau, a mountain range
Talas (river), in Kyrgyzstan and Kazakhstan
Talas, also known as Taraz, Kazakhstan
Talas, Kayseri, Turkey

Other uses
Talas alphabet, a Turkic script
Talas, an American rock band featuring Billy Sheehan
VIA Talas, a former Yugoslav New Wave band
Tropical Storm Talas, the name of several storms
Talas, a character in the TV series Star Trek: Enterprise
Talas, deity of Albanian mythology

See also
Tala (disambiguation)
Talash (disambiguation)
Battle of Talas, 751 AD